Sirindhornia bifida is a species of moth of the family Tortricidae. It is found in Thailand.

The length of the forewings is about 3.8 mm. The basal area of the forewings is white, with relatively large and confluent black spots and an orange distal wing part. The distal two-thirds are orange, its inner margin near the costa preceded by two conspicuous black spots, edged by a wide blackish band.

Etymology
The species name refers to the sacculus which is distally separated from the valva and is derived from Latin bifida (meaning divided into two parts).

References

Moths described in 2014
Enarmoniini